Manuela Campanelli is a distinguished professor of astrophysics and mathematical sciences of the Rochester Institute of Technology, and the director of their Center for Computational Relativity and Gravitation and Astrophysics and Space Sciences Institute for Research Excellence. Her work focuses on the astrophysics of merging black holes and neutron stars, which are powerful sources of gravitational waves, electromagnetic radiation and relativistic jets. This research is central to the new field of multi-messenger astronomy.

She is a Fellow of the American Physical Society (2009), a Fellow of International Society on General Relativity and Gravitation Fellowship (2019), and a Trustee awardee.

Professional work 
Campanelli is known for her groundbreaking work in gravitational wave astrophysics. She was lead author on a paper that produced a breakthrough in gravitational wave astrophysics in 2005; she also discovered that supermassive black holes can be ejected from their host galaxies at up to 4000 km/s. She then moved on to studying the behavior of matter around inspiraling black holes, both in the mini disks size, growth and potential electromagnetic emissions. She has received many awards, including the Marie Curie Fellowship (1998), the RIT Trustees Scholarship Award, was mentioned in Kip Thorne's Nobel Prize lecture  and her paper for the gravitational wave breakthrough was listed as one of the landmark papers of the century by the American Physical Society. She was also the chair of the APS topical group in gravitation in 2013.

Biography 
Campanelli was born in Switzerland, but moved with her family to Italy at the age of 14. She received an undergraduate degree in applied mathematics from the University of Perugia in Italy in 1991, and a PhD in theoretical physics from the University of Bern in Switzerland in 1996. She moved then to the University of Utah and then to the Max Planck Institute in Germany, where she began to use supercomputer simulations to understand how black holes coalesce.

After five years at the University of Texas at Brownsville, Dr. Campanelli joined the Rochester Institute of Technology in 2007.

Publications

Books

Journal articles

References 

Year of birth missing (living people)
Living people
Swiss astrophysicists
Italian astrophysicists
Swiss people of Italian descent
Women astrophysicists
Rochester Institute of Technology faculty
University of Bern alumni
University of Perugia alumni
Fellows of the American Physical Society